This is a list of American television-related events in 1949.

Events

Television programs

Debuts

Changes of network affiliation

Ending this year

Television stations

Station launches

Network affiliation changes

Births

Deaths

References

External links
List of 1949 American television series at IMDb